Adah Sharma (born 11 May 1992), is an Indian actress who mainly appears in Hindi and Telugu-language films. Sharma, after finishing her schooling, made her acting debut with a leading role in the 2008 Hindi language horror film 1920, a box office success. Her portrayal of a possessed woman in the film was critically praised and earned her a Filmfare Award for Best Female Debut nomination. After the release of her romantic comedy film Hasee Toh Phasee (2014), she ventured into the South Indian film industries, making films in Telugu.

Early life and education
Adah Sharma was born in Mumbai to a tamil Brahmin family hailing from tamilnadu. Her father, S. L. Sharma, was a captain in the merchant navy and her mother, is a classical dancer. When she was in tenth grade, she had decided that she wanted to become an actress. She wanted to drop out of school but her parents insisted that she complete her schooling at least. After completing her twelfth grade, she stopped studying.

Sharma is a gymnast. She has been dancing since the age of three, and has completed her graduation in Kathak from the Natraj Gopi Krishna Kathak Dance Academy in Mumbai. She had learnt salsa for four months in the US, besides jazz and ballet, and has claimed to be "very good" at belly dancing.

Career
 
Trying to break into the film industry, Sharma auditioned for several roles, but was rejected either because of her curly hair or because the casting directors felt that she looked too young. She eventually landed the lead female role in the 2009 Hindi horror film 1920 opposite Rajneesh Duggal, directed by Vikram Bhatt. Her portrayal of a possessed woman was unanimously praised by critics. The Times of Indias Nikhat Kazmi commented that she "delivers a consummate performance", and labelled her performance as "excellent", "[exceptionally] brilliant", and "incredibly convincing". The film was a commercial success, Bhatt's first box office hit after six years and 10 films, and earned Sharma a Best Female Debut nomination at the 54th Filmfare Awards. Three years later, she had her next release, Phhir, again a horror film, which saw her collaborating with Vikram Bhatt, who wrote the film, and her 1920 co-star Rajneesh Duggal. Phhir, however, was not as well received as 1920, opening to negative reviews, and failing at the box office, with Sharma getting mixed response for her performance. While Sujata Chakrabarti wrote that "not even for a minute does she exude the intensity of being a psychic", Sify's Sonia Chopra stated that she was "the only one in the film who can act". Her third film, the romantic comedy Hum Hai Raahi Car Ke, released another two years later and was a critical and financial failure.
In 2014, Sharma had two releases: Puri Jagannadh's romance Heart Attack opposite Nithiin, that marked her Telugu debut and a Hindi film Hasee Toh Phasee alongside Sidharth Malhotra and Parineeti Chopra, which released seven days later and featured her in a supporting role. She described her character in the former as "vulnerable, yet extremely sexy" and worked for two months on her Telugu diction. Sharma received positive remarks for her performance in Heart Attack, with The Times of India writing that she "looks like a natural actress and does a decent job" while 123telugu.com felt that she had made a "stunning debut". Both films were commercially successful, with Hasee To Phasee ending up as one of the highest-grossing Hindi films of 2014.

Her next two films, the Telugu family drama S/O Satyamurthy, in which she was cast opposite Allu Arjun and Samantha Ruth Prabhu, and was directed by Trivikram Srinivas, and the Pavan Wadeyar's action thriller Rana Vikrama, alongside Puneeth Rajkumar and Anjali, her first Kannada project, released on consecutive days in April 2015. Both films were financial successes as well, with the former, having collected over  80 crore, emerging as one of the highest-grossing Telugu films of all time, in spite of receiving mixed reviews from critics. For her next film, she was paired opposite Sai Dharam Tej in Subramanyam for Sale, a Telugu romantic comedy . Directed by Harish Shankar, the film was proved to be a moderate success, and Sharma received good reviews for her performance. At the 5th edition of Indian Federation for Fashion Development's India Runway Week, Sharma dazzled in a beautiful lehenga as she walked the ramp for Shravan Kumar. The designer kept the collection region-specific and showcased the lesser known handlooms of the south.
 
Sharma had three releases in February 2016, two of which were in Telugu language. Her first film, the romantic comedy Garam was directed by Madan and she was cast as the love interest of the character played by Aadi. Her next film was the acclaimed thriller Kshanam where she played the central role of Swetha, who seeks help from her ex-boyfriend (Adivi Sesh). Her final release of the year was the romantic comedy Idhu Namma Aalu, her first Tamil film, in which she had a small role and also performed an item number on the song "King Kong", which topped the charts in South India and her dance moves as well as pairing with Silambarasan was praised. Her next release was the thriller Commando 2, a sequel to the 2013 film Commando: A One Man Army, where she plays the female lead role of an inspector opposite Vidyut Jammwal. Commercially, the film was an average-grosser. In 2020, she played the role of a transgender woman in a MX PLAYER webseries titled Pati patni aur panga.

Filmography

Films
{| class="wikitable sortable plainrowheaders"
|-
! Year
! Title
! Role 
! Language
! Notes
|-
| 2008
| scope="row" | 1920
| Lisa Singh Rathod / twins Spirit
| rowspan="3" |Hindi
| Nominated—Filmfare Award for Best Female Debut
|-
| 2011
| scope="row" | Phhir
| Disha
|
|-
| 2013
| scope="row" | Hum Hai Raahi Car Ke
| Sanjana Mehra
|
|-
| rowspan="2" | 2014
| scope="row" | Heart Attack
| Hayathi
| Telugu
|Telugu debut
|-
| scope="row" | Hasee Toh Phasee
|Karishma Solanki
|Hindi
|
|-
| rowspan="3" |  2015
| scope="row" | S/O Satyamurthy
| Pallavi Kolasani
| Telugu
|
|-
| scope="row" | Rana Vikrama
| Paaru
| Kannada
|Kannada debut
|-
| scope="row" | Subramanyam for Sale
| Durga 
| rowspan="3" |Telugu
|
|-
| rowspan="3" | 2017
| scope="row" | Garam
| Sameera 
|
|-
| scope="row" | Kshanam
| Swetha
|
|-
| scope="row" |Idhu Namma Aalu
|Herself
| Tamil
| Special appearance in song
|- 
|| 2017 
| scope="row" | Commando 2 
|Bhavna Reddy
|Hindi
|
|-
| rowspan="4" |2019
| scope="row" |  Charlie Chaplin 2 
|Saara
|Tamil
|Tamil debut
|-
| scope="row" | Kalki
| Dr.Padma
| Telugu 
|
|-
| scope="row" | Bypass Road 
| Radhika
| rowspan="2" |Hindi
|
|-
| scope="row" | Commando 3
|Bhavna Reddy
|
|-
|| 2022 
| scope="row" | Meet Cute 
|Shalini
|Telugu
|
|-
| rowspan="2" |2023
|Selfiee
|Meera 
|Hindi
|
|-
| || ||  Filming
|
|-
|}

Web series

Short films

Music videos

References

External links 

 

Living people
Actresses from Mumbai
Indian film actresses
Indian television actresses
Actresses in Hindi cinema
Actresses in Telugu cinema
Actresses in Kannada cinema
Actresses in Tamil cinema
Actresses in Hindi television
21st-century Indian actresses
1992 births